The Irish Regiment of Canada is a Primary Reserve infantry regiment of the Canadian Army based in Sudbury, Ontario. It is part of the 4th Canadian Division's 33 Canadian Brigade Group. Currently one battalion of the regiment exists.

The Irish regiment was founded in 1915 with headquarters in Toronto. The modern incarnation was formed  in Sudbury in 1965 by the conversion of the 58th Field Artillery Regiment, RCA, which became 2nd Battalion, Irish Regiment of Canada. At the same time, the original battalion in Toronto was reduced to nil strength and placed on the Supplementary Order of Battle as the 1st Battalion, The Irish Regiment of Canada.

In 1931 they became the only kilted Irish Regiment in the world with the adoption of their unique tartan often called "O'Saffron" designed by Thomas Gordon Ltd. of Glasgow. (Irish regiments in the British Army utilize kilted pipers wearing a solid-coloured saffron kilt.) They also share the caubeen headdress common to other Irish regiments.

Lineage

Irish Regiment of Canada
Authorized on 15 October 1915 as the 110th Irish Regiment
Redesignated 1 May 1920 as The Irish Regiment
Redesignated 1 September 1932 as the Irish Regiment of Canada
Amalgamated 15 December 1936 with the headquarters and A Company of the 1st Machine Gun Battalion, CMGC, and redesignated as the Irish Regiment of Canada (Machine Gun)
Redesignated 12 August 1940 as the Irish Regiment of Canada
Redesignated 7 November 1940 as the 2nd (Reserve) Battalion, the Irish Regiment of Canada
Redesignated 31 January 1946 the Irish Regiment of Canada
Reduced to nil strength and transferred to the Supplementary Order of Battle 10 February 1965
Amalgamated 15 March 1965 with the 58th (Sudbury) Field Artillery Regiment, RCA. The artillery unit was converted to infantry and redesignated as the 2nd Battalion, the Irish Regiment of Canada (Sudbury), with the unit transferred to the Supplementary Order of Battle being automatically redesignated as the 1st Battalion, the Irish Regiment of Canada.

The 1st Machine Gun Battalion, CMGC
Originated 1 June 1919 in Toronto, Ontario as the 1st Machine Gun Brigade, CMGC
Redesignated 15 September 1924 as the 1st Machine Gun Battalion, CMGC
Amalgamated 15 December 1936 with the Irish Regiment of Canada

The 58th (Sudbury) Field Artillery Regiment, RCA
Originated 1 April 1946 in Sudbury, Ontario as the 49th Heavy Anti-Aircraft Regiment, RCA
Redesignated 3 July 1947 as the 58th Light Anti-Aircraft Regiment, RCA
Redesignated 15 March 1948 as the 58th (Sudbury) Light Anti-Aircraft Regiment, RCA
Redesignated 12 April 1960 as the 58th (Sudbury) Light Anti-Aircraft Artillery Regiment, RCA
Redesignated 10 December 1962 as the 58th (Sudbury) Field Artillery Regiment, RCA
Converted 15 March 1965 to infantry and amalgamated with the 173rd Field Battery, RCA, the 174th Field Battery, RCA, the 175th Field Battery, RCA and the Irish Regiment of Canada and redesignated as the 2nd Battalion, the Irish Regiment of Canada (Sudbury)

The 173rd Field Battery, RCA
Originated 2 February 1920 in Sudbury, Ontario as the 30th Battery, CFA
Redesignated 1 July 1925 as the 30th Field Battery, CA
Redesignated 3 June 1935 as the 30th Field Battery, RCA
Redesignated 7 November 1940 as the 30th (Reserve) Field Battery, RCA
Redesignated 15 May 1943 as the 30th (Reserve) Anti-Aircraft Battery (Type 2H), RCA
Redesignated 1 April 1946 as the 30th Heavy Anti-Aircraft Battery, RCA
Redesignated 3 July 1947 as the 173rd Light Anti-Aircraft Battery, RCA
Redesignated 10 December 1962 as the 173rd Field Battery, RCA
Converted 15 March 1965 to infantry and amalgamated with the Irish Regiment of Canada

The 174th Field Battery, RCA
Redesignated 3 July 1947 as the 174th Light Anti-Aircraft Battery, RCA
Redesignated 10 December 1962 as the 174th Field Battery, RCA
Converted 15 March 1965 to infantry and amalgamated with the Irish Regiment of Canada

The 175th Field Battery, RCA
Originated 2 February 1920 in Sudbury, Ontario as the 53rd Battery, CFA
Redesignated 1 July 1925 as the 53rd Field Battery, CA
Redesignated 3 June 1935 as the 53rd Field Battery, RCA
Redesignated 7 November 1940 as the 53rd (Reserve) Field Battery, RCA
Redesignated 15 May 1943 as the 53rd (Reserve) Anti-Aircraft Battery (Type 2H), RCA
Redesignated 1 April 1946 as the 153rd Heavy Anti-Aircraft Battery, RCA
Redesignated 3 July 1947 as the 175th Light Anti-Aircraft Battery, RCA
Redesignated 10 December 1962 as the 175th Field Battery, RCA
Converted 15 March 1965 to infantry and amalgamated with the Irish Regiment of Canada

Lineage charts

Perpetuations

The Great War
180th Battalion (Sportsmen), CEF
208th Battalion (Canadian Irish), CEF
1st Battalion, Canadian Machine Gun Corps, CEF
30th Field Battery, Canadian Field Artillery, CEF
53rd Field Battery, CFA, CEF

Operational history

The Great War
The 180th Battalion (Sportsmen), CEF was authorized on 15 July 1916 and embarked for Great Britain on 14 November 1916. There its personnel were absorbed by the 3rd Reserve Battalion, CEF on 6 January 1917 to provide reinforcements to the Canadian Corps in the field. The battalion disbanded on 21 May 1917.

The 208th Battalion (Canadian Irish), CEF was authorized on 15 July 1916 and embarked for Great Britain on 3 May 1917. There it provided reinforcements to the Canadian Corps in the field until its personnel were absorbed by the 2nd  Reserve Battalion, CEF and the 8th Reserve Battalion, CEF on 3 January 1918. The battalion disbanded on 15 September 1920.

The 1st Battalion, CMGC, CEF, which was organized in France on 27 March 1918 from the Brigade machine gun companies of the 1st Canadian Division. It provided machine gun support to the 1st Canadian Division in France and Flanders until the end of the
war. The battalion was disbanded on 15 November 1920.

The 30th Field Battery, CFA, CEF, was authorized on 20 April 1915 and embarked for Great Britain on 5 February 1916. The battery disembarked in France on 14 July 1916, where it provided field artillery support as part of the 8th Army Brigade, CFA, CEF in France and Flanders until the end of the war. The battery disbanded on 1 November 1920.

The 53rd Field Battery, CFA, CEF was authorized on 15 July 1916 as the 53rd "Overseas" Depot Battery, CEF', and embarked for Great Britain on 19 September 1916. The battery disembarked in France on 21 August 1917, where it provided field artillery support as part of the 13th Brigade, CFA, CEF, in France and Flanders until the end of the war. The battery disbanded on 1 November 1920.

The Second World War
Details from the regiment were placed on service on 26 August 1939 and then placed on active service on 1 September 1939 as the Irish Regiment of Canada (Machine Gun), CASF (Details), for local protection duties. Those details called out on active service disbanded on 31 December 1940.

The regiment mobilized the Irish Regiment of Canada (Machine Gun), CASF for active service on 24 May 1940. It was redesignated as the Irish Regiment of Canada, CASF on 12 August 1940; and as the 1st Battalion, The Irish Regiment of Canada, CASF on 7 November 1940. It embarked for Great Britain on 28 October 1942. It landed in mainland Italy on 10 November 1943, as part of the 11th Infantry Brigade, 5th Canadian Armoured Division. Between 20 and 27 February 1945, the battalion moved with the I Canadian Corps to North-West Europe as part of Operation Goldflake, where it fought until the end of the war. The overseas battalion disbanded on 31 January 1946.

The 53rd Field Battery mobilized as the 53rd Field Battery, RCA, CASF on 1 September 1939. On 1 June 1940 it amalgamated with the 26th Field Battery, RCA, CASF and was redesignated as the 26th/53rd Field Battery, RCA, CASF. On 1 January 1941 this amalgamation ceased and it was redesignated as the 53rd Field Battery, RCA, CASF and as the 53rd Light Anti-Aircraft Battery, RCA, CASF the same day. It provided light antiaircraft artillery support as part of the 11th Light Anti-Aircraft Regiment, RCA, CASF, in Great Britain. The overseas battery disbanded on 1 March 1944.

Afghanistan
The regiment contributed an aggregate of more than 20% of its authorized strength to the various Task Forces which served in Afghanistan between 2002 and 2014.

Alliances 
 - The Royal Irish Regiment (27th (Inniskilling) 83rd, 87th and Ulster Defence Regiment)

Battle honours
In the list below, battle honours in small capitals are for large operations and campaigns and those in lowercase are for more specific battles. Bold type indicates honours authorized to be emblazoned on regimental colours.

Irish Regiment of Canada Regimental Museum

The museum provides a place to exhibit the Irish Regiment of Canada memorabilia dating from the First World War. It provides a venue for veterans and others who wish to donate service memorabilia for exposition. The museum is a venue to exhibit service memorabilia after the First World War including the United Nations Operations – Korea – 1950-1953 and peacekeeping operations. It is a venue to educate Northern Ontario citizens about the Canadian Forces, in particular the
local militia units, to appreciate their roles and the necessity to support them.

Order of precedence

Media
The Story of the Irish Regiment of Canada 1939-1945 by Major Gordon Wood

See also 

 Organization of Military Museums of Canada

Notable Members 

 Major Alan Cockeram 
 Major General Herb Petras

References

External links

 Official Website of the 2nd Battalion, Irish Regiment of Canada
 Clifford Weirmeir's historical page on the Irish Regiment Of Canada
 2nd Battalion, The Irish Regiment of Canada at army.ca

Irish Regiment of Canada
Military units and formations of Ontario
Regimental museums in Canada
Infantry regiments of Canada in World War II
Military units and formations established in 1915